Messala or Messalla may refer to:

Ennodius Messala, a Roman senator in Ostrogothic Italy
Messala Merbah (born 1994), Algerian footballer who plays for JS Saoura as a midfielder
Marcus Silius Messala, a Roman Politician, senator and suffect consul towards the end of the 2nd century
Valerii Messallae
Mashallah ibn Athari (died 815 AD), astronomer
Messala (crater) on the moon, named after the astronomer
Messala Severus, a character in the novel Ben-Hur
A character in the manga version of the film Big Tits Zombie
A Mobile Suit that appears in the anime series Mobile Suit Zeta Gundam

See also 
 Messalina (disambiguation), diminutive form